Groombridge railway station is a station on the Spa Valley Railway (SVR) in Groombridge, East Sussex, England. Once a busy station serving four directions, it closed in 1985 to British Rail services. A new station the other side of Station Road bridge was opened by the SVR in 1997 as part of a standard gauge heritage railway to Tunbridge Wells West.

Early years 
The first Groombridge station was opened in 1866 by the London, Brighton and South Coast Railway (LBSCR) with the extension of its Three Bridges to Tunbridge Wells Central Line to Tunbridge Wells; its importance increased two years later when the line from Lewes was completed, and yet again with the opening of the Cuckoo Line opening up routes to Polegate and Eastbourne. At this time trains from Lewes and Uckfield could only reach East Grinstead by reversing at Groombridge.

The station buildings were designed by Charles Henry Driver.

Authority was therefore obtained in 1878 to lay a single track spur south of Ashurst Junction which would enable services to bypass Groombridge. Although completed in 1888 this spur remained largely unused until 1914 . It was eventually doubled to handle increased traffic on the Cuckoo Line and regular services to Uckfield.
This spur thus reduced the importance of Groombridge as a junction station as direct Victoria - Crowborough/Uckfield services no longer had to reverse at Groombridge. The opening of the spur meant that more services were routed through Eridge which became the point where London trains were divided for the two lines south. To compensate for this loss, slip coaches were shed from some down trains at Ashurst.

Upon the completion of the Cuckoo Line in 1880, the line between Eridge and Groombridge was doubled. At the same time, a crossover was constructed on the western side of Groombridge station, together with associated signalling equipment, and later the Groombridge West signal box. A second signal box, "Groombridge Junction", was provided on the opening of the Cuckoo Line, and a third, "Groombridge West" (the first signal box's name was changed to "Groombridge East"), was added in 1888 after the opening of the Oxted Line. Within 10 years of nationalisation, the three signal boxes had been closed by British Rail and replaced by a single box on 23 November 1958 when the Groombridge section was resignalled.

Main station building 

Groombridge station building situated on the east side of Station Road is architecturally "the exact counterpart in miniature of Tunbridge Wells", and constructed of red brick with string courses of blue and white brick, including coloured brick reveals to the doors and windows. The stationmaster's original residence was on the western side of the building adjacent to a booking hall, while at the same time a new goods and parcels office was added to the eastern end of the building, next to the gentlemen's toilets. A subway led from the main platform to the island platform where until 1896 there were no passenger facilities; upon the urging of a passenger, a waiting room and buffet were provided at a cost of £2,300.

The station was equipped with three platform faces: the main station platform was used for down trains, whilst the far side of an island platform served the up trains. A double track ran through the station, with a third line splaying out to the other side of the island before merging once again with the line to Tunbridge Wells. Four sets of goods sidings lay to the north of the main station serving a carriage dock, blacksmith's shop and stable. The extensive goods yard and generous facilities did not, however, see much use, and the Southern Railway used the station as a collection point for empty wagons and, at one point, as a holding yard for Tunbridge-bound trains.

A footbridge was installed in 1889 to the west of the station to carry the footpath crossing the railway line to pass over the embankment; this replaced deep cutting steps which led down the embankment on either side of the footpath, the use of which was becoming ever more dangerous with the increasing traffic. By 1899 the levels of traffic generated from the Oxted Line prompted the LBSCR to invest in extending the island platform and re-aligning the track around it.

Decline 

Until 1965 north-south services were run in two sections: Victoria - Tunbridge Wells West, and Tunbridge Wells West - Brighton/Eastbourne. These two sections interconnected at Groombridge where with Eastbourne and Tunbridge Wells coaches were detached from London trains; traffic grew from around 80 trains per day in the 1900s to 120 in the 1930s and more than 200 per day in the 1950s. The pattern of operations changed completely in the wake of the Beeching Report when the relative importance of Groombridge and Eridge as railway junctions diminished with the closure of one after another of the lines in the area. The Cuckoo Line was the first to go in June 1965, followed by the line from Three Bridges and East Grinstead in January 1967 and then the Uckfield line to the south of Uckfield in 1969. The line between Ashurst Junction and Groombridge, was taken out on 5 January 1969. At the same time, the signal box opened in 1958 was closed leaving the block signalling section between Tunbridge Wells West and Birchden Junction.

The section from Birchden Junction to Grove Junction remained open with an hourly off peak 3-coach DEMU shuttle between Eridge and Tonbridge with connecting services at Eridge was provided for Uckfield line passengers. By the 1980s the section had been gradually run-down with little maintenance, disruptions to service patterns and the reduction of services to a dozen or so per day, all of which took its toll on passenger numbers, although some commuter traffic did remain. Groombridge station was staffed on the morning shift only by the wife of a railwayman at Tunbridge Wells West, and she kept the station clean and presentable, whilst the tracks outside became overgrown, the 1958 signal box remained boarded-up and the goods yard contained a moribund coal merchant's business. In 1985 the Department for Transport gave British Rail the go-ahead to close the line from Eridge to Tunbridge Wells provided alternative bus services were provided, and it was announced that the last service would run on 6 July. Empty carriage stock trains continued to pass through the station until the last train on 10 August 1985 after which the line was closed completely. A private company called "Surrey Downs Ltd" proposed running a joint service with BR from Tonbridge to Uckfield, but this never materialised amid scepticism from BR that somebody outside the industry could make a loss-making line pay.

Revival 

In 1996 the Spa Valley Railway acquired the trackbed between Tunbridge Wells West and Birchden Jn and, after much hard work, restored a public service from Tunbridge Wells West to Groombridge in August 1997. As the original Groombridge station is now a private residence and the old ticket offices are now offices for a local financial adviser, it was necessary to build a new station on the opposite side of the road bridge with access via the old main station platform which has been extended to the new station. The island platform has been demolished and houses have been built on part of the trackbed requiring the new single track to curve along the trackbed of the old up loop line into the new station.

Canopies have been erected on the station, using the former canopy supports from Gravesend West station. A new signal box is now under construction as part of the extension to Eridge. The signal box has been far updated from the current picture a LBSCR signal frame (originally from Birchden Junction signal box) has been installed and the box first operated on 1 August 2014. A new refreshment kiosk has been constructed and is selling local produce, hot and cold drinks and ice creams. The section of line between Groombridge to Eridge re-opened on 25 March 2011.

References

External links 
Groombridge railway station at the Spa Valley Railway
Groombridge railway station at Subterranea Britannica

Heritage railway stations in East Sussex
Former London, Brighton and South Coast Railway stations
Railway stations in Great Britain opened in 1866
Railway stations in Great Britain closed in 1985
Railway stations in Great Britain opened in 1997
1866 establishments in England
Charles Henry Driver railway stations
railway station